WIBV 102.1 FM is a radio station broadcasting a country music format. Licensed to Mount Vernon, Illinois, the station serves the areas of Mount Vernon, Illinois and Centralia, Illinois, and is owned by Benjamin Stratemeyer.

References

External links
WIBV Cardinal Country Facebook

IBV